Andrew Jackson Goodpaster (February 12, 1915 – May 16, 2005) was an American Army General. He served as NATO's Supreme Allied Commander, Europe (SACEUR), from July 1, 1969, and Commander in Chief of the United States European Command (CINCEUR) from May 5, 1969, until his retirement December 17, 1974. As such, he was the commander of all NATO (SACEUR) and United States (CINCEUR) military forces stationed in Europe and the surrounding regions.

Goodpaster returned to the military in June 1977 as the 51st Superintendent of the United States Military Academy at West Point, New York, until he retired again in July 1981.

Career
Goodpaster entered the United States Military Academy at West Point in 1935, followed in 1939 by a commission as a second lieutenant in the Corps of Engineers after graduating second in his class of 456. After serving in Panama, he returned to the U.S. in mid-1942, and in 1943, he attended a wartime course at the Command and General Staff School, Fort Leavenworth, Kansas.

During World War II, Goodpaster commanded the 48th Combat Engineer Battalion in North Africa and Italy. He was awarded the Distinguished Service Cross, the Silver Star, and two Purple Hearts for his service in World War II. His combat experience was cut short in January 1944, when he was severely wounded and sent back to the United States to recover. After his wounds had healed, he was assigned to the War Planning Office under General Marshall, where he served the duration of the war.

Goodpaster was seen by many as the quintessential "soldier-scholar." He received a Ph.D. in politics from Princeton University in 1950 after completing a doctoral dissertation titled "National technology and international politics." He later received an honorary Doctor of Laws degree from Princeton in 1979. Princeton says he earned degrees in civil engineering and politics.

Key assignments
Staff Secretary and Defense Liaison Officer to President Eisenhower (1954–1961)
Advisor to the Administrations of Presidents Johnson (1963–1969), Nixon (1969–1974), and Carter (1977–1981)
Commander of the San Francisco District of the U.S. Army Corps of Engineers (USACE)
Commander of the 8th Infantry Division in Germany (1961–1962)
Director of the Joint Staff, Office of the Joint Chiefs of Staff (1966–1967)
Commandant of the National War College (1967–1968)
Deputy Commander of the U.S. Military Assistance Command, Vietnam (MACV) (1968–1969)
Commander-in-Chief of USEUCOM and Supreme Allied Commander of NATO Forces (1969–1974)
Superintendent, USMA (1977–1981)

First retirement
After retiring in 1974, he served as senior fellow at the Woodrow Wilson International Center for Scholars in 1975–76, and taught at The Citadel. His book, For the Common Defense was published in 1977.

He was brought back to active duty as Superintendent of the U.S. Military Academy (1977–1981) after 1976 West Point cheating scandal involving 151 cadets (see also, 1951 West Point cheating scandal). Although he had retired with the rank of General (four star), he voluntarily served as superintendent at the lower rank of Lieutenant General (three stars), since the billet carries that rank.

Second retirement and later years
In 1981, when Goodpaster retired for the second time, being advanced back to four-star rank. He stayed active in retirement serving on various boards and working on his own memoirs. He died at age 90 at Walter Reed Army Medical Center and is interred at Arlington National Cemetery.

Advocacy for the elimination of nuclear weapons
In his later years, Goodpaster was vocal in advocating the reduction of nuclear weapons. Later his position evolved to advocating for elimination of all nuclear weapons. In September 1994, he commented, "Increasingly, nuclear weapons are seen to constitute a nuisance and a danger rather than a benefit or a source of strength." In 1996, along with General Lee Butler and Rear Admiral Eugene Carroll, Goodpaster co-authored a statement for the Global Security Institute advocating the complete elimination of nuclear weapons due to their danger and lack of military utility.

Civilian service
Goodpaster was a fellow at the Eisenhower Institute, and the Institute for Defense Analyses in Washington. He served on American Security Council and founded the Committee on the Present Danger, emphasizing the Soviet Union's military threat and a corresponding need for a strong defense for the United States.

He served as a trustee and a chairman of the George C. Marshall Foundation, which established the Andrew J. Goodpaster Award to honor, "American business leaders, politicians, military leaders and others who have served our nation in exemplary ways, who, like General Goodpaster, have exhibited great courage, selfless service, patriotism and leadership in their lives and careers." Among the recipients have been John P. Jumper, Raymond T. Odierno, Gordon R. Sullivan, and Brent Scowcroft.

For many years in retirement, Goodpaster was a trustee of St. Mary's College of Maryland, playing important roles in advancing the school to national prominence. A building on the school's campus, Goodpaster Hall, is named in his honor.

Awards
In January 1961, President Dwight D. Eisenhower awarded Goodpaster the Distinguished Service Medal for his work in the position of Staff Secretary to the President of the United States, and as Liaison Officer of the Department of Defense to the White House, 1954–1961, “for distinguished service in a position of grave responsibility.” This award was mistakenly identified in the original press release as the Medal of Freedom. Goodpaster was actually awarded the Distinguished Service Medal at this ceremony—the press release is in error. Goodpaster's copy of the press release has the words "Medal of Freedom" lined out, and "Distinguished Service Medal" written over it. As a serving US Army officer at the time, Goodpaster could not have received the Medal of Freedom, a civilian award. Eisenhower mentioned that he was amazed that the award had been kept a surprise; Goodpaster later joked that if he had known about it, the paperwork would have been correct.
At General Goodpaster's first retirement in 1974, President Gerald Ford awarded him the Defense Distinguished Service Medal.
In 1984, President Ronald Reagan awarded Goodpaster the Presidential Medal of Freedom “for his contributions in the field of international affairs.” This was the first and only award of this medal to Goodpaster.
In 1985, he received the Golden Plate Award of the American Academy of Achievement presented by Awards Council member and Supreme Allied Commander Europe, General Bernard W. Rogers, USA.
In 1992, he received the United States Military Academy Association of Graduates’ Distinguished Graduate Award.

Dates of rank
Cadet, United States Military Academy - 1 July 1935
2nd Lieutenant, Regular Army (RA) - 12 June 1939
1st Lieutenant, Army of the United States (AUS) - 9 September 1940
Captain, AUS - 1 February 1942
1st Lieutenant, Regular Army - 12 June 1942
Major, AUS - 29 October 1942
Lieutenant Colonel, AUS - 23 June 1943
Captain, RA - 1 July 1948
Major, RA - 14 May 1951
Colonel, AUS - 10 September 1952
Brigadier General, AUS - 1 January 1957
Lieutenant Colonel, RA - 22 March 1957
Major General, AUS - 1 August 1956
Lieutenant General, AUS - 27 January 1964
Colonel, RA - 12 June 1964
Brigadier General, RA - 30 January 1966
General, AUS - c. June 1968
General, Retired List - c. December 1974  

Note - During and after World War II officers with temporary commissions were commissioned in the Army of the United States (AUS) whereas permanent commissions were in the United States Army (i.e. the Regular Army).

Works
Listed in reverse chronological order of date published:
Goodpaster, Andrew J. and Rossides, Eugene. Greece's Pivotal Role in World War II and Its Importance to the U.S. Today. Washington, D.C.: American Hellenic Institute Foundation, 2001.
Goodpaster, Andrew  J. When Diplomacy Is Not Enough: Managing Multinational Military Interventions: A Report To The Carnegie Commission On Preventing Deadly Conflict. New York: Carnegie Commission on Preventing Deadly Conflict, 1996.
Goodpaster, Andrew J. Gorbachev and the Future of East-West Security: A Response for the Mid-Term. Atlantic Council of the United States Occasional paper, April 1989.
Goodpaster, Andrew  J. et al. U. S. Policy Toward the Soviet Union. A Long-Term Western Perspective, 1987–2000. Lanham, MD: University Press of America, Lanham, MD, 1988.
National Security and Détente. Foreword by General Andrew J. Goodpaster with contributions by faculty members of the U.S. Army War College. New York: Thomas Y. Crowell Company, Apollo Editions, 1987.
Goodpaster, Andrew  J. Strengthening Conventional Deterrence in Europe: A Program for the 1980s. Westview Special Studies in International Security. Boulder, Colorado: Westview Press, 1985.
Goodpaster, Andrew J. and Elliot, Lloyd. Toward a Consensus on Military Service – Report of the Atlantic Council's Working Group on Military Service.  Tarrytown, New York: Pergamon Press, 1982.
Goodpaster, Andrew J. For the Common Defense. Lanham, MD: Lexington Books, 1977.
Goodpaster, Andrew  J. Civil-Military Relations: Studies in defense policy. Washington, D.C.: American Enterprise Institute for Public Policy Research, 1977.
Goodpaster, Andrew J. and Huntington, Samuel P. Civil-Military Relations. University of Nebraska Press, Omaha: American Enterprise Institute for Public Policy Research, Washington D.C., 1977.
Goodpaster, General Andrew J. SHAPE and Allied Command Europe In the Service of Peace and Security. 1973.

See also

 List of Supreme Allied Commanders Europe (SACEUR)

References

Further reading
 Jordan, Robert S. An Unsung Soldier: The Life of Gen. Andrew J. Goodpaster. Naval Institute Press, 2013. ; Chris Booth. H-NET review
 Nelson, C. Richard. The Life and Work of General Andrew J. Goodpaster: Best Practices in National Security Affairs. Rowman & Littlefield, 2016. .

External links
General Goodpaster's NATO tribute
Interview about President Eisenhower for the WGBH series, War and Peace in the Nuclear Age
White House Office of the Staff Secretary Records, Dwight D. Eisenhower Presidential Library 

|-

|-

1915 births
2005 deaths
United States Army personnel of World War II
Burials at Arlington National Cemetery
Carter administration personnel
Eisenhower administration personnel
Lyndon B. Johnson administration personnel
NATO Supreme Allied Commanders
Nixon administration personnel
People from Highlands, New York
People from Granite City, Illinois
Presidential Medal of Freedom recipients
Princeton University School of Engineering and Applied Science alumni
Recipients of the Air Force Distinguished Service Medal
Recipients of the Defense Distinguished Service Medal
Recipients of the Distinguished Service Cross (United States)
Recipients of the Distinguished Service Medal (US Army)
Recipients of the Legion of Merit
Recipients of the National Order of Vietnam
Recipients of the Navy Distinguished Service Medal
Recipients of the Silver Star
St. Mary's College of Maryland
Superintendents of the United States Military Academy
United States Army Command and General Staff College alumni
United States Army generals
United States Military Academy alumni
White House Staff Secretaries
Military personnel from Illinois